Études-Tableaux ("study-pictures") may refer to:

 The eight Études-Tableaux, Op. 33, a set of piano études composed by Sergei Rachmaninoff in 1911
 The nine Études-Tableaux, Op. 39, a set of piano études composed by Sergei Rachmaninoff in 1916–17